This is a comprehensive list of episodes for the animated television comedy Drawn Together. Each episode (except "Lost in Parking Space, Part One" and "Nipple Ring-Ring Goes to Foster Care") contains at least one musical number that ties into the action of the scene in which it appears. These are either original songs (some parodies of existing songs) sung by the cast (often full-blown production numbers), or outside songs that play during montages. Season 1 premiered on October 27, 2004. Season 3, which consists of fourteen episodes, began airing on October 5, 2006. After a one-year hiatus, new episodes returned October 4, 2007 with the last seven episodes of Season 3. The series finale aired on November 14, 2007. A total of 36 episodes were produced over the series' three seasons.

Series overview

Episodes

Season 1 (2004)

Season 2 (2005–06)

Season 3 (2006–07)

Film
 The Drawn Together Movie: The Movie!

References

External links
 
 

Lists of American adult animated television series episodes
Lists of American sitcom episodes
Drawn Together